Foundry Branch is a tributary stream of the Potomac River in Washington, DC. The historic headwaters of the stream originate in the Tenleytown area in Northwest Washington, however at present the section of the stream north of Massachusetts Avenue is hydrologically separated from the lower section and runs through a large stormwater pipe under the daylighted portion.  The daylight portion of the stream can be seen south of Massachusetts Avenue, in Glover-Archbold Park, and the stream continues to the Potomac, which drains to the Chesapeake Bay.

The stream was named for the Columbia Foundry, established in Georgetown by Henry Foxall in 1799, along the banks of the stream which had previously been known as Deep or Mill Creek.

See also
List of District of Columbia rivers

References

 United States Geological Survey. Reston, VA. "Foundry Branch." Geographic Names Information System (GNIS). Accessed 2009-09-22.

External links
EPA report on Foundry Branch (2006)

Tributaries of the Potomac River
Rivers of Washington, D.C.